Andrei Sartassov (born 10 November 1975) is a Russian-born Chilean former professional road racing cyclist. In 2009 it was revealed that he, along with his Chilean teammate Juan Francisco Cabrera Torres, had tested positive in 2007 for EPO during the Vuelta de Chile.

Major results

2001
 1st Stage 4 Doble Copacabana GP Fides
 2nd Overall Vuelta de Chile
2002
 1st Stage 4b Doble Copacabana GP Fides
 7th Overall Vuelta Ciclista de Chile
1st Stages 9 & 11 
2003
 1st Stage 6b Doble Copacabana GP Fides
2004
 1st Stage 6b Vuelta Ciclista de Chile
 1st Stage 7 Volta Ciclistica Internacional de Santa Catarina
 2nd Overall Vuelta por un Chile Líder
2005
 1st Stage 1 Vuelta a San Juan
 5th Overall Vuelta Ciclista de Chile
2006
 1st Overall Vuelta Ciclista de Chile
1st Stages 3 & 8a
 1st Overall Vuelta por un Chile Líder
1st Stages 3b (TTT), 5 & 8b
 1st Stage 6b Doble Copacabana GP Fides
 2nd Overall Vuelta a Mendoza
1st Stage 1
 3rd Overall UCI America Tour
2007
 1st Overall Vuelta por un Chile Líder
1st Stages 2b (TTT), 7b & 8
 2nd Overall Vuelta a Peru
1st Stages 5 (TTT), 7 & 8
 1st Stage 7 Vuelta a Mendoza

References

External links
 
 

1975 births
Living people
Naturalized citizens of Chile
Cyclists at the 2011 Pan American Games
Russian male cyclists
Vuelta Ciclista de Chile stage winners
Place of birth missing (living people)
Pan American Games competitors for Chile
Sportspeople from Tatarstan